Caramujo is a low-class neighborhood in the northern zone of Niterói, Brazil. The word caramujo in Portuguese language means snail.

Neighbourhoods of Niterói